Tómbola is a Spanish language entertainment news show hosted by Marisa del Portillo, Tanya Charry, Carolina Sandoval, actor/model Andrés García Jr., and actress/TV host Alexandra Rodriguez. From October 10, 2011, to December 29, 2011, Telefutura aired Tómbola weeknights at 6pm/5pm central, succeeded both Escandalo TV & La Tijera. From December 30, 2011, to January 17, 2012, Tombola aired weekdays at 5pm/4pm central, and was canceled afterwards, due to low ratings.

References

External links
Official website

2011 American television series debuts
UniMás original programming

es:Tombola